"Brotherly Love" is a song written by Jimmy Alan Stewart and Tim Nichols, which has been recorded by Moe Bandy, as well as a duet between Keith Whitley and Earl Thomas Conley.

Bandy's version appears on his 1989 studio album Many Mansions for Curb Records. The song was the second single from that album, reaching a peak of number 53 on the country music charts in 1989.

Country singer Billy Dean recorded the song on his 1990 debut album Young Man.

Chart performance

Keith Whitley/Earl Thomas Conley version
Keith Whitley and Earl Thomas Conley recorded the song as a duet in 1987, but it was not included on an album until it concurrently appeared on Whitley's posthumous 1991 album Kentucky Bluebird and Conley's 1991 album Yours Truly. This duet version charted for twenty weeks on Hot Country Singles & Tracks, peaking at number 2 and holding the position for one week. This was the last Top 10 hit for both Whitley and Conley.

In 1992, this version was nominated by the Country Music Association for Vocal Event of the Year. It also earned them a nomination for the Grammy Award for Best Country Collaboration with Vocals.

Personnel
Compiled from liner notes.
 Eddie Bayers — drums
 Sam Bush — mandolin
 Paul Franklin — steel guitar
 Rob Hajacos — fiddle
 Brent Mason — electric guitar
 Mac McAnally — acoustic guitar
 Dave Pomeroy — upright bass
 Matt Rollings — piano

Chart performance

Year-end charts

References

1989 singles
1991 singles
Moe Bandy songs
Billy Dean songs
Earl Thomas Conley songs
Keith Whitley songs
Male vocal duets
Songs written by Tim Nichols
Song recordings produced by Garth Fundis
RCA Records singles
Songs released posthumously
1989 songs
Songs about siblings